Zaamslagveer is a hamlet in the Dutch province of Zeeland. It is a part of the municipality of Terneuzen, and lies about 30 km southeast of Vlissingen.

Zaamslagveer is not a statistical entity, and the postal authorities have placed in under Zaamslag. Place name signs are present. 134 people lived in Zaamslagveer in 1840. There are currently about 50 homes there.

References

Populated places in Zeeland
Terneuzen